Elections to Metropolitan Borough of Southwark were held in 1953.

The borough had ten wards which returned between 3 and 8 members. Labour won all the seats with 84% of the vote in one ward.

Election result

|}

References

Council elections in the London Borough of Southwark
1953 in London
1953 English local elections